Khvajeh Morad (also Romanized as Khvājeh Morād; also known as Chāh-e Khvājeh Morād and Khvājeh Murād) is a village in Fal Rural District, Galleh Dar District, Mohr County, Fars Province, Iran. At the 2006 census, its population was 530, in 96 families.

References 

Populated places in Mohr County